Frank Sanucci (1901–1991) was an Argentine-born American composer who scored numerous films. Born in Buenos Aires he emigrated to the United States as a child. He worked in Hollywood on generally low-budget productions, many of them for Monogram Pictures where he was employed for several years. He was also employed at Universal Pictures, Grand National Pictures and Astor Pictures.

Selected filmography

 Song of the Gringo (1936)
 Headin' for the Rio Grande (1936)
 Riders of the Rockies (1937)
 Riders of the Dawn (1937)
 God's Country and the Man (1937)
 Stars Over Arizona (1937)
 Hittin' the Trail (1937)
 Trouble in Texas (1937)
 Where Trails Divide (1937)
 Romance of the Rockies (1937)
 The Mystery of the Hooded Horsemen (1937)
 Tex Rides with the Boy Scouts (1937)
 Arizona Days (1937)
 Where the Buffalo Roam (1938)
 The Singing Outlaw (1938)
 Border Wolves (1938)
 Two Gun Justice (1938)
 Frontier Town (1938)
 The Last Stand (1938)
 Prison Break (1938)
 Prairie Justice (1938)
 Feud of the Range (1938)
 Gunsmoke Trail (1938)
 Outlaw Express (1938)
 Starlight Over Texas (1938)
 Mystery Plane (1939)
 Westbound Stage (1939)
 Ghost Town Riders (1939)
 Lure of the Wasteland (1939)
 Rollin' Westward (1939)
 Riders of the Sage (1939)
 Guilty Trails (1939)
 Down the Wyoming Trail (1939)
 Mesquite Buckaroo (1939)
 The Phantom Stage (1939)
 Overland Mail (1939)
 Stunt Pilot (1939)
 Man from Texas (1939)
 Riders of the Frontier (1939)
 El Diablo Rides (1939)
 The Cowboy from Sundown (1940)
 The Golden Trail (1940)
 Roll Wagons Roll (1940)
 Rhythm of the Rio Grande (1940)
 Covered Wagon Trails (1940)
 Rollin' Home to Texas (1940)
 Wild Horse Valley (1940)
 Pinto Canyon (1940)
 Riot Squad (1941)
 Tonto Basin Outlaws (1941)
 Ridin' the Cherokee Trail (1941)
 Riding the Sunset Trail (1941)
 The Gang's All Here (1941)
 Fugitive Valley (1941)
 Silver Stallion (1941)
 The Pioneers (1941)
 Gentleman from Dixie (1941)
 The Living Ghost (1942)
 Rock River Renegades (1942)
 King of the Stallions (1942)
 Thunder River Feud (1942)
 Western Mail (1942)
 Arizona Roundup (1942)
 The Man with Two Lives (1942)
 Boot Hill Bandits (1942)
 Where Trails End (1942)
 Down Texas Way (1942)
War Dogs (1942)
 Trail Riders (1942)
 One Thrilling Night (1942)
 Texas Trouble Shooters (1942)
 Arizona Stage Coach (1942)
 Phantom Killer (1942)
 Texas to Bataan (1942)
 Haunted Ranch (1943)
 Wild Horse Stampede (1943)
 The Texas Kid (1943)
 Two Fisted Justice (1943)
 Death Valley Rangers (1943)
 Cowboy Commandos (1943)
 The Law Rides Again (1943)
 Song of the Range (1944)
 Arizona Whirlwind (1944)
 Harmony Trail (1944)
 Trigger Law (1944)
 Marked Trails (1944)
 Youth Aflame (1944)
 A Fig Leaf for Eve (1944)
 Sonora Stagecoach (1944)
 Fighting Bill Carson (1945)
 Stranger from Santa Fe (1945)
 Saddle Serenade (1945)
 Springtime in Texas (1945)
 Flame of the West (1945)
 The Lonesome Trail (1945)
 Northwest Trail (1945)
 His Brother's Ghost (1945)
 Riders of the Dawn (1945)
 Border Bandits (1946)
 Song of the Sierras (1946)
 Trail to Mexico (1946)
 West of the Alamo (1946)
 Swing, Cowboy, Swing (1946)
 Moon Over Montana (1946)
 Rainbow Over the Rockies (1947)
 Six-Gun Serenade (1947)
 Deadline (1948)
 Fighting Mustang (1948)
 Sunset Carson Rides Again (1948)
 Buffalo Bill in Tomahawk Territory (1952)

References

Bibliography
 Pitts, Michael R. Poverty Row Studios, 1929–1940: An Illustrated History of 55 Independent Film Companies, with a Filmography for Each. McFarland & Company, 2005.

External links

1901 births
1991 deaths
People from Buenos Aires
Argentine film score composers
American film score composers
Argentine emigrants to the United States